Naesiotus is a genus of tropical air-breathing land snails, a pulmonate gastropod mollusks in the family Bulimulidae.

Species 
Species within the genus Naesiotus include:

 Naesiotus achatellinus (Forbes, 1850)
 Naesiotus adelphus (Dall, 1917)
 Naesiotus akamatus (Dall, 1917)
 Naesiotus albemarlensis (Dall, 1917)
 Naesiotus alethorhytidus (Dall, 1917)
 Naesiotus altus (Dall, 1893)
 Naesiotus amastroides (Ancey, 1887)
 Naesiotus andivagus Weyrauch, 1956
 Naesiotus arnaldoi (Lanzieri & Rezende, 1971)
 Naesiotus bambamarcaensis Weyrauch, 1960
 Naesiotus beldingi (Cooper, 1892)
 Naesiotus calchaquinus (Doering, 1879)
 Naesiotus calvus (G. B. Sowerby I, 1833)
 Naesiotus canaliferus (Reibisch, 1893)
 Naesiotus carlucioi (Rezende & Lanzieri, 1963)
 Naesiotus catlowiae (L. Pfeiffer, 1853)
 Naesiotus cavagnaroi A. G. Smith, 1972
 Naesiotus cerrateae Weyrauch, 1967
 Naesiotus chemnitzioides (Forbes, 1850)
 Naesiotus christenseni (W. B. Miller & Reeder, 1984)
 Naesiotus cinerarius (Dall, 1917)
 Naesiotus cosmicus (Mabille, 1895)
 Naesiotus crepundius (d'Orbigny, 1835)
 Naesiotus cutisculptus (Ancey, 1901)
 Naesiotus deletangi (Parodiz, 1946)
 Naesiotus dentifer (Mabille, 1895)
 Naesiotus durangoanus (E. von Martens, 1893)
 Naesiotus elegantulus Weyrauch, 1956
 Naesiotus eos (Odhner, 1951)
 Naesiotus eschariferus (G. B. Sowerby I, 1838)
 Naesiotus eudioptus (Ihering in Pilsbry, 1897)
 Naesiotus excelsus (Gould, 1853)
 Naesiotus exornatus Reeve, 1849
 Naesiotus fernandezae Weyrauch, 1958
 Naesiotus gabbi (Crosse & P. Fischer, 1872)
 Naesiotus galapaganus (L. Pfeiffer, 1855)
 Naesiotus geophilus Weyrauch, 1967
 Naesiotus gigantensis (Christensen & W. B. Miller, 1977)
 Naesiotus gracillimus Weyrauch, 1956
 Naesiotus haasi Weyrauch, 1956
 Naesiotus haematospira (Pilsbry, 1900)
 Naesiotus hannai (Pilsbry, 1927)
 Naesiotus harribaueri (Jacobson, 1958)
 Naesiotus jacobi (G. B. Sowerby I, 1833)
 Naesiotus laevapex (Christensen & W. B. Miller, 1977)
 Naesiotus lopesi (Rezende, Lanzieri & Inada, 1972)
 Naesiotus lycodus (Dall, 1917)
 Naesiotus milleri (Hoffman, 1987)
 Naesiotus montezuma (Dall, 1893)
 Naesiotus montivagus (d'Orbigny, 1835)
 Naesiotus munsterii (d'Orbigny, 1837)
 Naesiotus nigromontanus (Dall, 1897)
 Naesiotus nuciformis (S.A.A. Petit De La Saussaye, 1853) (synonym: Bulimus nuciformis Petit, 1853)
 Naesiotus nuculus (L. Pfeiffer, 1854)
 Naesiotus nux (Broderip, 1832)
 Naesiotus ochsneri (Dall, 1917)
 Naesiotus oxylabris (Doering, 1879)
 Naesiotus pachys (Pilsbry, 1897)
 Naesiotus pallidior (G. B. Sowerby I, 1833)
 Naesiotus pallidus (Reibisch, 1893)
 Naesiotus pazianus (D'Orbigny, 1835)
 Naesiotus perspectivus (L. Pfeiffer, 1846)
 Naesiotus pilsbryi Weyrauch, 1956
 Naesiotus pollonerae (Ancey, 1897)
 Naesiotus quitensis (Pfeiffer, 1848) - 
 Naesiotus reibischi (Dall, 1895)
 Naesiotus rhabdotus (Haas, 1951)
 Naesiotus rimatus (L. Pfeiffer, 1847)
 Naesiotus rivasii (d'Orbigny, 1837)
 Naesiotus rocayanus (d'Orbigny, 1835)
 Naesiotus rugatinus (Dall, 1917)
 Naesiotus rugiferus (G.B. Sowerby I, 1833) (synonym: Bulimus rugiferus Sowerby I, 1833)
 Naesiotus rugulosus (G. B. Sowerby I, 1838)
 Naesiotus sculpturatus (L. Pfeiffer, 1846)
 Naesiotus silvaevagus Weyrauch, 1960
 Naesiotus spirifer (Gabb, 1868)
 Naesiotus stenogyroides (Guppy, 1868) - endemic to Dominica
 Naesiotus subcostatus (Haas, 1948) 
 Naesiotus tanneri (Dall, 1895)
 Naesiotus tarmensis Weyrauch, 1967
 Naesiotus trichodes (A.V.M.D. D'Orbigny, 1835) 
 Naesiotus turritus Weyrauch, 1967
 Naesiotus unifasciatus (G. B. Sowerby I, 1833)
 Naesiotus ustulatus (G. B. Sowerby I, 1833)
 Naesiotus ventrosus (Reibisch, 1893)
 Naesiotus veseyianus (Dall, 1893)
 Naesiotus vestalis (Albers, 1854)
 Naesiotus willinki Breure, 1978
 Naesiotus wolfi (Reibisch, 1893)
 Naesiotus xantusi (Binney, 1861)
 Naesiotus zilchi Weyrauch, 1956

Species brought into synonymy
 Naesiotus bicolor Weyrauch, 1967: synonym of Bostryx bicolor (Weyrauch, 1967)
 Naesiotus chrysalis (L. Pfeiffer, 1847): synonym of Protoglyptus chrysalis (L. Pfeiffer, 1847) (unaccepted combination)
 Naesiotus eudioptus (Ihering in Pilsbry, 1897): synonym of Simpulopsis eudioptus (Ihering in Pilsbry, 1897) (superseded combination)
 Naesiotus latecolumellaris Weyrauch, 1967: synonym of Bostryx latecolumellaris (Weyrauch, 1967) (original combination)
 * Naesiotus luciae (Pilsbry, 1897) : synonym of Protoglyptus luciae (Pilsbry, 1897)
 Naesiotus martinicensis (L. Pfeiffer, 1846): synonym of Protoglyptus martinicensis (L. Pfeiffer, 1846) (unaccepted combination)
 Naesiotus mazei (Crosse, 1874): synonym of Protoglyptus mazei (Crosse, 1874) (unaccepted combination)
 Naesiotus pilosus (Guppy, 1871): synonym of Protoglyptus pilosus (Guppy, 1871) (unaccepted combination)
 Naesiotus sanctaeluciae (E. A. Smith, 1889): synonym of Protoglyptus sanctaeluciae (E. A. Smith, 1889) (unaccepted combination)

Distribution 
Distribution of the genus Naesiotus include Ecuador, Colombia, Dominica (1 species), Peru, ...

Human use 
People are sometimes consuming them raw, but consumption of raw snails is not recommended because snails can be vector of number of parasites.

References

External links 
 Albers, J. C.; Martens, E. von. (1860). Die Heliceen nach natürlicher Verwandtschaft systematisch geordnet von Joh. Christ. Albers. Ed. 2. Pp. i-xviii, 1-359. Leipzig: Engelman 
 Breure A. S. H. (1975). "Caribbean land molluscs: Bulimulidae, II. Plekocheilus and Naesiotus". Studies on the Fauna of Curaçao and other Caribbean Islands 46: 71-93, pls. 6-8, tables 8-14
 Breure, A. S. H. & Araujo, R. (2017). The Neotropical land snails (Mollusca, Gastropoda) collected by the “Comisión Científica del Pacífico.”. PeerJ. 5, e3065

Bulimulidae
Gastropod genera